Whereabouts is an album by Canadian singer-songwriter Ron Sexsmith, released in 1999 on Interscope Records. The album was a nominee for Roots & Traditional Album of the Year – Solo at the 2000 Juno Awards.

Critical reception
Entertainment Weekly wrote that "producers Mitchell Froom and Tchad Blake do a wonderfully understated job of colorizing Sexsmith’s sad-kid melodies and voice." The Washington Post wrote that the album "suggests the songs of a less clever Elvis Costello sung by David Byrne in his most earnest mode." Rolling Stone called it "twelve near-perfect songs, the whole clocking in at under forty minutes." Trouser Press wrote: "Carrying along such instrumental window dressing as banjo, strings, woodwinds and horns, it is overly languorous and stylistically diverse." The New Yorker called the songs "either low-country laments or mid-tempo lullabies—minimalist heartbreakers all."

Track listing

References

1999 albums
Ron Sexsmith albums
Albums produced by Tchad Blake
Albums produced by Mitchell Froom